Ionactis alpina (formerly Aster scopulorum; common name lava ankle-aster) is a species of flowering plant in the family Asteraceae known by the common name lava aster. It is native to western United States from California to Montana, where it grows in dry areas.

Description
Ionactis alpina is a perennial herb growing from a caudex and fibrous root system. Most of the small leaves are on the lower part of the stem.

The inflorescence bears solitary flower heads with purple-green phyllaries, 7–21 thin blue, purple, or occasionally white ray florets surrounding 19–50 long yellow disc florets. The fruit is a hairy achene.

References

External links
Jepson Manual Treatment - Ionactis alpina
United States Department of Agriculture Plants Profile; Ionactis alpina

Astereae
Flora of the Western United States
Plants described in 1834
Flora without expected TNC conservation status